Zar-Tash is a village in the Batken Region of Kyrgyzstan. It is part of the Batken District. Its population was 915 in 2021.

References

Populated places in Batken Region